Hervé Bourquel (born 11 July 1957) is a French rower. He competed in the men's coxed pair event at the 1980 Summer Olympics.

References

1957 births
Living people
French male rowers
Olympic rowers of France
Rowers at the 1980 Summer Olympics
Place of birth missing (living people)